Family Name or Family name may refer to:

Name
 Surname, the portion of a personal name that indicates family, tribe or community
 Clan name (disambiguation), applied differently in several cultures

Other uses
 Family Name (film), a 2006 Russian-Kazakh drama film
 Family Name (horse), 1974 winner of the Miss Woodford Stakes
 "Family Name", a song by Prince from the 2001 album The Rainbow Children

See also 
 Indian name
 List of family name affixes